Komárovice is a municipality and village in Třebíč District in the Vysočina Region of the Czech Republic. It has about 100 inhabitants.

Notable people
Vincenc Lesný (1882–1953), indologist and translator

References

Villages in Třebíč District